Montrose Manor is a census-designated place in Spring and Cumru Townships in Berks County, Pennsylvania, United States.  It is located along US Route 222 just north of Mohnton.  In the 2010 census, the population was recorded as 604 residents.

Demographics

References

Census-designated places in Berks County, Pennsylvania
Census-designated places in Pennsylvania